Starkweather is a 2004 film directed by Byron Werner, written by Working Class Films founder and screenwriter Stephen Johnston (with scripts including In the Light of the Moon and Ted Bundy), and starring Brent Taylor and Shannon Lucio.

The film is based on the life of spree killer Charles Starkweather. It was filmed in September 2003 in Acton, California and Lancaster, California and filmed on 35mm.

Cast
 Brent Taylor as Charles Starkweather
 Shannon Lucio as Caril Ann Fugate
 Jerry Kroll as Sheriff Merle Karnopp
 Lance Henriksen as The Mentor
 Steven K. Grabowsky as The Dark Man
 Rodney Ballard as Young Charles
 George Lindsey, Jr. as Guy Starkweather
 Keir O'Donnell as Bob Von Buch
 America Young as Barbara Fugate
 Justin Ipock as Bobby Colvert
 Al Sapienza as Deputy Dale Fahrnbruch

External links
 
 

2004 films
2000s biographical films
2004 crime drama films
2004 independent films
American biographical films
American crime drama films
American independent films
Biographical films about criminals
Films set in 1958
Films set in Nebraska
Films shot in California
Thriller films based on actual events
Crime films based on actual events
2000s English-language films
2000s American films